WXCZ (103.3 MHz) is a commercial FM radio station licensed to Cedar Key, Florida. The station is owned by Betty Marcocci, through licensee WGUL-FM, Inc., and features a country music radio format.  It is simulcast on 104.3 WXZC in Inglis, Florida.  The two stations call themselves "Nature Coast Country."

History
The station was given a construction permit and was assigned the call letters WVNM on 1991-08-09. On 1995-08-01, the still-unbuilt station changed its call sign to WCQQ, on 1996-07-15 to WRGO, and on 2017-07-24 to the current WXCZ.

The station signed on the air in March 1996, as WCQQ, originally at 102.7 MHz.  It was owned by Stoehr Communications and aired an oldies format.  In the early 2010s, the station moved to 103.3 MHz.

References

External links

XCZ
Country radio stations in the United States
Radio stations established in 1996
1996 establishments in Florida